The Sisters of the Society of Saint Pius X are a semi-contemplative order of religious sisters founded by Archbishop Marcel Lefebvre on September 22, 1974. The motherhouse is located in Saint-Michel-en-Brenne, France, with additional houses in Argentina, Australia, Belgium, Germany, Italy, Switzerland and the United States. As of 2018, the current Superior General is Mother Maria Jean Bréant.

History
The Society of Sisters was guided in its initial formation by Archbishop Lefebvre, who was formerly Superior General of the Holy Ghost Fathers, and his sister, Mother Marie Gabriel. For more than forty years, Mother Marie Gabriel had devoted herself to missionary work in Martinique, the West Indies and Africa, in the Congregation of the Holy Ghost Sisters. She had spent much time on the African continent.

In October, 1973, the first postulant for this new religious congregation, Janine Ward, arrived at Ecône from Australia.

In 1974, while recovering from an illness in Europe, Mother Marie Gabriel had a religious vision which was to point her in another direction. The signs became clearer: the crisis in the Church, the continual loss of faith and religious spirit in her own congregation, her weakened health, her brother's insistent appeal for aid in transmitting the religious life, all contributed to her decision to guide the fledgling congregation of the Sisters of the Society.

The first novitiate was installed in Albano, near Rome. There Janine's postulancy continued under Mother Marie Gabriel's guidance until her reception of the habit on September 22, 1974, the true founding of the new religious institute. Two years later, September 29, 1976, the first profession was held. The congregation counted twelve novices and eight postulants in the chapel during this ceremony.

In May, 1984, Sister Mary Jude, an American sister who spent almost two years at St. Mary's College in Kansas (from 1981 to 1983), became the new Superior General of the Sisters. There were thirty-four professed sisters in eight houses and four different countries at this time.

The third Superior was Mother Marie-Augustin de Poulpiquet, who from 2006–2018 had been the head of the sisterhood for two terms of office.

On Monday, April 9, 2018, the capitulars elected Sister Maria Jean Bréant, the former mistress of novices of the Order, the fourth Superior General. Her term of office is six years. Thus far, Sr. Maria Jean worked at the novitiate Notre-Dame de Compassion in Ruffec.

Locations

Argentina
La Reja, Argentina (1986): school, seminary care, former Spanish-language novitiate
Pilar, Argentina (1989): Spanish-language novitiate

Australia
Sydney, Australia (1988): school, parish work

Belgium
Brussels, Belgium (1982): school, parish work

France
Abbey of Saint-Michel – Saint-Michel-en-Brenne, France (1977): Motherhouse, former French-language novitiate
Le Pointet, France (1979): retreat house
Unieux, France (1980): school, parish work
Marseilles, France (founded in 1982 in Dijon, France; moved to Marseille in 1989): school, parish work
Ruffec, France (1989): French-language novitiate
Le Bremien, France (1991): retirement and nursing home
Châteauroux, France (1992): domestic and parish work
Bruges, France (1996): school, parish work
Suresnes, France (1998): domestic and sacristy care of District House
Gastines, France (2006): retreat house

Germany
Unlingen-Göffingen, Germany (1992): German-language novitiate

Italy
Albano Laziale (1997): former motherhouse, domestic work for the receiving of pilgrims

Switzerland
Geneva, Switzerland (1977): school, parish work
Wil, Switzerland (2003): school, parish work

United States
Saint Mary's Academy and College – St. Marys, Kansas (1981): school, parish work
Browerville, Minnesota (founded in 1986 in Armada, Michigan; moved to Browerville in 1990): English-language novitiate

African Missions
Libreville, Gabon (1993): mission apostolate

See also
 Traditional Catholicism
 List of Catholic religious institutes
 SSPX-affiliated religious orders
 Tridentine Mass

References

External links
 Priestly Society of Saint Pius X: La Porte Latine – Sisters of the Society
 SSPX: Society of St. Pius X, U.S. District official website

Traditionalist Catholic nuns and religious sisters
Society of Saint Pius X
Christian religious orders established in the 20th century
Christian organizations established in 1974